Joseph Ludwig Raabe (15 May 1801 in Brody, Galicia – 22 January 1859 in Zürich, Switzerland) was a Swiss mathematician.

Life

As his parents were quite poor, Raabe was forced to earn his living from a very early age by giving private lessons. He began to study mathematics in 1820 at the Polytechnicum in Vienna, Austria. In the autumn of 1831, he moved to Zürich, where he became professor of mathematics in 1833. In 1855, he became professor at the newly founded Swiss Polytechnicum.

He is best known for Raabe's ratio test, an extension of d'Alembert's ratio test. Raabe's test serves to determine the convergence or divergence of an infinite series, in some cases. He is also known for the Raabe integral of the gamma function:

Publications

 Differential- und Integralrechnung (3 volumes) (Zürich, 1839-1847)
 Mathematische Mitteilungen (2 volumes) (1857-1858)

References

1801 births
1859 deaths
People from Brody
Swiss mathematicians